Calhoun Falls State Park is a state park located on the shores of Lake Russell near the town of Calhoun Falls in Abbeville County, South Carolina.

Activities and amenities

Activities available at the park include picnicking, fishing, hiking, swimming, biking, and camping.

Amenities include a playground, a boat ramp, picnic shelters, tennis courts, a basketball court and a park store.  Fishing rods and reels are available for rental at the park office.

A marina offers boat slips available for rental on a yearly basis.

The park also manages McCalla State Natural Area, a  future backcountry park, located near the town of Lowndesville. It has a 10-mile trail for equestrian use with previous permission from Calhoun Falls State Park.

References

External links

State parks of South Carolina
Protected areas of Abbeville County, South Carolina